Netronome is a privately held fabless semiconductor company specializing in the design of network flow processors used for intelligent flow processing in network and communications devices, such as switches, routers and cyber security applications.

History 
Netronome was founded in 2003 by Niel Viljoen, David Wells and Johann Tönsing, who had all previously worked for Marconi. Niel Viljoen served as Chief Technology Officer at Marconi, having been General Manager at Fore Systems, acquired by Marconi for $4.6 billion in 1999. Viljoen served as the CEO and president of Netronome from 2003 until 2011. Between February 2011 and 2013, Howard Bubb stepped in as Chief Executive Officer. However, in July of that year Viljoen once again took over as CEO.

In November 2007, Netronome announced a technology licensing and sales and marketing agreement with Intel Corporation focused on the extension of the Intel IXP28XX product line of network processors. Under the terms of the agreement, Netronome is developing a next-generation line of IXP-compatible, high-end network processors that combine the Intel IXP28XX technology with Netronome's architecture.

In March 2010, Netronome announced it began shipping the Network Flow Processor (NFP–3240), specifically designed for tight coupling with x86 architectures.

In January 2016, Netronome announced its Agilio family of server-based networking solutions.

References 

 

Cloud computing providers